A hero shooter is a subgenre of shooter games that cover both the first-person shooter and third-person shooter genres. These games emphasize "hero" characters that have distinctive abilities and/or weapons that are specific to them.

Game design
Hero shooters are a variation of multiplayer first- or third-person shooters, where players form into two or more teams and select from pre-designed "hero" characters that each possess distinctive attributes, skills, weapons, and other passive and active abilities. Hero shooters strongly encourage teamwork between players on a team, guiding players to select effective combinations of hero characters and coordinate the use of hero abilities during a match.

Hero shooters take many of their design elements from older class-based shooter, multiplayer online battle arena (MOBA) and fighting games. Some incorporate the role-playing elements from MOBAs, where as a match progresses, the player can opt to buy or improve predefined skills for their selected hero, adapting these to the dynamics of the match. In other hero shooters, players have freedom to change to a new hero at respawn points as to alter team composition to better challenge their opponents.

Because of the focus on heroes as distinctive characters, hero shooters will often feature more narrative elements than traditional team-based shooters, providing backstories for each character and an emphasis on the story and world in which the games are set.

History

Origins
The origins of hero shooters can be traced back to early tactical shooters that featured class-based playable characters in multiplayer modes. Games like Battlefield 1942 and Team Fortress Classic featured specific roles that a player could select that would come with their own unique abilities and sometimes specific weapons that were not available to the other classes. While the majority of tactical shooters were the main games that featured some form of class based mechanics, other shooters also featured the same gameplay style and had their own take on the system such as Star Wars: Battlefront & Conker: Live & Reloaded.

Valve's Team Fortress 2 in 2007 created the main framework and inspiration for the subgenre. While Team Fortress 2 featured the same class-based system as its predecessor, each specific class was now its own unique "character," which came with a specific personality and appearance. This made the roles more fleshed out and feel more like a real person rather than just a nameless playable character. As Valve continued to expand the game, the company released additional media, including a line of "Meet the Team" videos that helped to build out each character class and their backstory. These "Meet the Team" videos established the use of cinematic narrative videos used in future hero shooters to introduce new hero characters.

Mainstream popularity: 2016–present
The subgenre had a substantial rise in popularity with the announcement of Battleborn and Overwatch in 2014, with both games later releasing nearly at the same time in 2016. Battleborn, by Gearbox Software, was the first game to use "hero shooter" in their press material in September 2014. Gearbox made the comparison of Battleborn as a hero shooter to how their Borderlands games were "shooter-looters". Gearbox considered a hero shooter, distinct from MOBAs as it was a first-person shooter first and foremost, but similar to "character-centric games [and] fighting games, hence the ‘hero’ in hero-shooter". Overwatch, announced by Blizzard Entertainment a few months after Battleborn announcement, was heavily inspired by Team Fortress 2 and MOBAs. Overwatch had evolved out from Blizzard's cancelled Titan, a class-based team shooter which the team had devised a large number of classes, which had caused scope creep and led Blizzard to cancel the project and cut the team. To save what they could, the remaining developers revised the classes into individual heroes with detailed backstories and personalities to make a team-focused hero shooter. Overwatch proved more popular of the two games, and by January 2021, Gearbox opted to shutter Battleborn servers. The rise in popularity of Overwatch was followed by a flood of similar games like LawBreakers (2017) and Gigantic (2017). The popularity of hero shooters also caused existing games that had used roles but without specific characterization, such as Tom Clancy's Rainbow Six Siege, Call of Duty, and Battlefield, to incorporate designed characters and narratives into their games.

Modern popular hero shooters include Tom Clancy's Rainbow Six Siege (2015), Overwatch (2016), Apex Legends (2019), and Valorant (2020).

See also
 Character class

References

 
Video game genres
Video game terminology